Paul Lazarus (born 4 September 1962) is an English retired professional footballer who played in the English Football League as a forward.

References

1962 births
Living people
Footballers from Stepney
English footballers
English expatriate footballers
Association football forwards
Charlton Athletic F.C. players
Wimbledon F.C. players
Dagenham F.C. players
Maidstone United F.C. (1897) players
Chelmsford City F.C. players
Fisher Athletic F.C. players
English Football League players
National League (English football) players
Expatriate footballers in Finland
IF Gnistan players
FC Kontu players